The Ibanez JS Series is a signature series of electric guitars endorsed by Joe Satriani and manufactured by Ibanez. It is essentially the discontinued Ibanez Radius series, with Satriani's select pickups installed. The JS100 is a lower-end model compared to the JS1000 and the JS1200. The JS1000 and JS1200 feature necks that are digitally reproduced from one of Satriani's guitars. The JS1600 was introduced at NAMM 2008.

Timeline dealing with various "Chrome Boys"
 1988 Joe Satriani starts endorsing Ibanez JS series
 1990 The innovative JS2CH "Chrome Boy" is produced
 1998 Ibanez releases the JS10th to celebrate their decade long partnership with Joe
 2005 JS2PRM is revealed at NAMM, just 60 were released
 2018 JS1CR is the 30th anniversary Ibanez JS signature

JS2CH
The original Chrome Boy. The JS2CH has a basswood body. There were very few produced as finishing problems occurred with cracking. "Pearly", Joe's prized prototype JS2CH Chrome Boy, was stolen in August 2002 and has never been recovered. Satriani's JS2CH was fitted with a Seymour Duncan Pearly Gates pickup, hence the name "pearly".

JS10th
The JS10th was Ibanez's second attempt at producing a chromed JS. The JS10th is a unique guitar with a luthite (plastic) body encased in chrome. Chrome plating such a curvy instrument is a very complex and difficult process resulting in many small (and some not so small) imperfections. Ibanez produced 506 of the JS10th model. Satriani himself has stated that he does not use the JS10th, as he prefers the Japanese basswood models (the JS2CH and its prototypes).

JS2PRM

The PRM "Premium Rock Mirror" was revealed at NAMM 2005 and although it belongs to the Chrome Boy family, it is actually basswood plated with aluminum. The first run of 20 had finish issues and the remaining guitars were produced in 2006.

JS20th
At NAMM 2008, Ibanez unveiled the JS20th and the JS1600. The JS20th features artwork from Satriani's 1987 album Surfing with the Alien with a chromed relief of the Silver Surfer character.

JS1CR
The 30th Anniversary Ibanez Joe Satriani Signature JS1CR features an alder body the sonic foundation for some of the most enduring pieces of contemporary music.

References

External links
JS Series at Ibanez.com
Joe Satriani Official Website
Ibanez Website
Joe Satriani Universe – Ibanez JS Guitars full list & specs
JS10th.com – Website dedicated to the JS10th Chromeboy
Ibanez page about NAMM 2008 with the JS 20th Anniversary and the JS1600
A transcript of an online chat with Joe Satriani where he discusses his gear

JS Series